Compensatory picks may refer to:

MLB Draft Compensatory Picks, picks awarded to Major League Baseball teams
NFL Draft Compensatory Picks, picks awarded to National Football League teams
NHL compensatory draft selection, picks awarded to National Hockey League teams